Krivany is a village and municipality in Sabinov District in the Prešov Region of north-eastern Slovakia.

History
In historical records the village was first mentioned in 1301.

Geography
The municipality lies at an altitude of 426 metres and covers an area of 18.867 km². It has a population of about 1135 people.

External links
https://web.archive.org/web/20070427022352/http://www.statistics.sk/mosmis/eng/run.html 

Villages and municipalities in Sabinov District
Šariš